Prakash Bhandari  (born 27 November 1935 in Delhi ) is a former cricketer who represented India in Test cricket.

Career 
Bhandari was an attacking right-handed batsman and an off-break bowler. He appeared for Delhi Schools and Delhi University in All India competitions between 1951–52 and 1956-57. He led Delhi University in the Rohinton Baria Trophy inter-university tournament in the last of those seasons. Bhandari played for the Indian XI against the Silver Jubilee Overseas Cricket Team in 1953-54 and toured Ceylon in 1956.

Bhandari toured Pakistan in 1954/55 as a teenager. After being the twelfth man thrice, he made his debut on the matting wicket in the final Test match at Karachi. He made 19 before being bowled by Khan Mohammad who broke one of the stumps. He also appeared in Tests against New Zealand and Australia. His highest score was 39 against New Zealand at Delhi in 1954-55 where he batted at No. 8 and added 73 with Bapu Nadkarni.

Against Rajasthan in the 1961–62 Ranji Trophy semifinal he scored a hundred in 60 minutes while Bengal was going for a declaration in the second innings. At the time it was believed to be the fastest hundred in Indian cricket, but a 60-minute hundred by Ken Goldie in 1915-16 and a 40-minute one by Ahsan-ul-Haq in 1923-24 have been discovered since then. He scored 58 in the first innings and took seven wickets in the same match. He compiled his highest first class score of 227 for Delhi against Patiala in 1957/58 and also took nine wickets in the same match for 81.

He worked with the Tata Group.

References

 Christopher Martin-Jenkins, The Complete Who's Who of Test Cricketers
 Anandji Dossa, Cricket Ties, Rupa & Co, 1978

External links
 Cricinfo Profile
 Cricketarchive Profile

India Test cricketers
Indian cricketers
East Zone cricketers
Delhi cricketers
Bengal cricketers
Bihar cricketers
North Zone cricketers
Indian Universities cricketers
1935 births
Living people
Cricketers from Delhi